Hesford is a surname. Notable people with the surname include:

Bob Hesford (1916–1982), British footballer 
Iain Hesford (1960–2014), British footballer
Michael Bryan Hesford (1930–1996), British organist and composer
Stephen Hesford (born 1957), British politician
Steve Hesford, British rugby league footballer